Zagon is a commune in Covasna County, Transylvania, Romania composed of two villages: Păpăuți (Papolc) and Zagon.

It lies on the banks of the river Zagon, at the foot of the Vrancea Mountains.

History 
The locality formed part of the Székely Land region of the historical Transylvania province. From 1876 until 1920, the village belonged to the Háromszék County of the Kingdom of Hungary. After the Treaty of Trianon, it became part of Romania.

Demographics
The commune is ethnically mixed with a Hungarian majority. According to the 2011 census, it has a population of 5,185, of which 51.3% or 2,662 are Székely Hungarians. Ethnic Romanians account for 48.6% (2,519) of the population. It is the birthplace of Kelemen Mikes, a well-known Hungarian political figure and essayist and Ecaterina Szabo, gold medalist gymnast at the 1984 Olympics.

References

Communes in Covasna County
Localities in Transylvania